Thalotia conica, common name the conical top shell, is a species of sea snail, a marine gastropod mollusk in the family Trochidae, the top snails.

Description
The solid shell is imperforate and elevated conical. The length of the shell varies between 13 mm and 23 mm. The spire is pinkish or grayish white with a crimson apex and numerous close longitudinal dark reddish-brown stripes, often cut into tessellations by the spiral grooves of the surface. The body whorl is dark-purple, with oblique, more or less zig-zag pale lines. The spire is straightly conical. The apex is acute. The sutures are linear. The seven whorls are nearly planulate, the last one obtusely subangular at the periphery. The whorls of the spire are encircled by 5 or 6 more or less granose lirae, spiral moniliform lines; the body whorl with about 13 or 14 in front of the aperture.. The wrinkles of increment are more or less prominent. The  aperture is rhomboidal. The outer lip is thickened and crenulated within. The thick peristome is plicate within. The straight columella is denticulate, ending abruptly in a strong basal truncation. The operculum is multispiral. This species is rather variable in sculpture; the spaces between the spiral ribs are often occupied by lirulae

Distribution
This marine shell occurs off Southwest Australia to New South Wales and off Tasmania

References

 Gray, J.E. 1826. Mollusca. pp. 474–496 in King, P.P. (ed). Narrative of a survey of the intertropical and western coasts of Australia. Performed between the years 1818 and 1822. London : John Murray Vol. 2.
 Wood, W. 1828. Index Testaceologicus; or A Catalogue of Shells, British and Foreign, arranged according to the Linnean system. London : Taylor Supplement, 1-59, pls 1-8.
 Menke, C.T. 1843. Molluscorum Novae Hollandiae Specimen in Libraria Aulica Hahniana. Hannover : Hahniana 46 pp
 Tenison-Woods, J.E. 1878. On some new marine Mollusca. Transactions and Proceedings of the Royal Society of Victoria 14: 55-65
 Kiener, L.C. 1875. Genus Trochus. 17, pl. 5 in Spécies général et Iconographie des coquilles vivantes, comprenant la collection du Muséum d'histoire Naturelle de Paris, la collection de Lamarck, celle du Prince Massena (appartenant maintenant a M. le Baron B. Delessert) et les découvertes récentes des voyageurs. Paris : Ballière.
 Philippi, R.A. 1850. Trochidae. pp. 121–136 in Küster, H.C. (ed). Systematisches Conchylien-Cabinet von Martini und Chemnitz. Nürnberg : Bauer & Raspe Vol. II.
 Crosse, H. 1864. Description d'espèces nouvelles provenant de l'Australie meridionale. Journal de Conchyliologie 12: 339-346 
 Brazier, J. 1887. Trochidae and other genera of South Australia, with their synonyms. Transactions of the Royal Society of South Australia 9: 116-125
 Pritchard, G.B. & Gatliff, J.H. 1902. Catalogue of the marine shells of Victoria. Part V. Proceedings of the Royal Society of Victoria 14(2): 85-138
 Allan, J.K. 1950. Australian Shells: with related animals living in the sea, in freshwater and on the land. Melbourne : Georgian House xix, 470 pp., 45 pls, 112 text figs.
 Cotton, B.C. 1959. South Australian Mollusca. Archaeogastropoda. Handbook of the Flora and Fauna of South Australia. Adelaide : South Australian Government Printer 449 pp.
 Macpherson, J.H. & Gabriel, C.J. 1962. Marine Molluscs of Victoria. Melbourne : Melbourne University Press & National Museum of Victoria 475 pp. 
 Ludbrook, N.H. 1978. Quaternary molluscs of the western part of the Eucla Basin. Bulletin of the Geological Survey of Western Australia 125: 1-286
 Phillips, D.A.B., Handreck, C., Bock, P.E., Burn, R., Smith, B.J. & Staples, D.A. (eds) 1984. Coastal Invertebrates of Victoria: an atlas of selected species. Melbourne : Marine Research Group of Victoria & Museum of Victoria 168 pp.

External links
 To Biodiversity Heritage Library (20 publications)
 To GenBank (5 nucleotides; 1 proteins)
 To USNM Invertebrate Zoology Mollusca Collection
 To World Register of Marine Species
 

conica
Gastropods described in 1827